Dan Easton Corbin (born April 12, 1982) is an American country music singer. He signed to Mercury Records Nashville in 2009 and released his self-titled debut album in March 2010, featuring the two number-one hits "A Little More Country Than That" and "Roll with It", as well as the number-14 hit "I Can't Love You Back". His second album, All Over the Road, was released in September 2012. Its first single, "Lovin' You Is Fun", was released in February 2012. The album's second single, "All Over the Road", was released in January 2013. As of 2021, he had sold over 500,000 albums and over 5 million singles. His song "Are You with Me" became an international hit in a remix version released by the Belgian DJ and record producer Lost Frequencies.

Biography
Dan Easton Corbin is a native of Trenton, Florida. He lived on his grandparents' farm following his parents' divorce, and was introduced to country music-themed television programs such as Hee Haw. After taking guitar lessons at 14 from session musician Pee Wee Melton at Dixie Music Center, he joined a band which won opening slots at a music festival and for Janie Fricke and Mel McDaniel.

He attended the University of Florida's College of Agricultural and Life Sciences and earned an agribusiness degree, before marrying his wife, Briann, on September 2, 2006. They moved to Nashville, Tennessee, on October 14, 2006, where he worked at an Ace Hardware and performed at writers' nights. A distant cousin who is a professor of entertainment management recommended him to contacts in Nashville.

On The Bobby Bones Show on September 3, 2013, Corbin mentioned that he is no longer married. He and Briann divorced in 2012.

Music career

2005–2011: Easton Corbin
In 2005 Easton Corbin entered a contest at First Street Music in Lake City, Florida, for the Annual Suwannee River Jam. Former store owner Andy Temple recognized his talent and introduced him to songwriter friend Reese Wilson which was the start of his career. In 2008 Corbin recorded a six track demo CD with Nashville based songwriter Reese Wilson and producer Steve Davis; on the CD were three full instrument tracks and three acoustic tracks. The songs on the demo were "All About You", "I Ain't A Highway", "Missin' You", "Gettin' 'Got, Good", "Miracles Happen" and a cover of Hank Williams, Jr's "Eleven Roses". Only a small number of the demo discs were pressed so the disc itself is very scarce and has become a highly sought after collectors item for hardcore fans. The tracks can be found digitally on YouTube. The tracks have never been added to any of Corbin's albums yet, making them still unreleased.

Joe Fisher, senior director of A&R at Universal Music Group Nashville, signed Easton Corbin to the Mercury Nashville label in 2009. He released his debut single, "A Little More Country Than That", in July. Rory Lee Feek of Joey + Rory wrote the song with Don Poythress and Wynn Varble. The label released a four-song digital extended play entitled A Little More Country Than That in August, shortly before the single entered Top 40 on the Billboard Hot Country Songs chart. Corbin's self-titled debut album was released in March 2010, under the production of Carson Chamberlain. The album had first-week sales of 43,000 copies, making for the highest first-week sales on the Mercury Nashville label in seven years.

"A Little More Country Than That" peaked at Number One on the country chart dated for the week ending April 3, 2010, making Easton Corbin the first solo male country artist to send a debut single to Number One since Dierks Bentley in 2003 with "What Was I Thinkin'". "Roll with It" was released as the album's second single; in October it also hit Number One. The album's third and final single, "I Can't Love You Back," released to radio in November 2010 and reached a peak of number 14 in early 2011.

To promote Easton Corbin, he went on tour as an opening act for Brad Paisley's H2O World Tour, which began in May 2010.

2012–2013: All Over the Road

Easton Corbin's fourth single, "Lovin' You Is Fun", was released in February 2012. It peaked at number 5 on the Billboard Country Airplay chart. It served as the lead-off single to his second studio album, All Over the Road, which was released on September 18, 2012. The album's second single, the title track, was released in January 2013 and peaked at number 3 on Country Airplay in September 2013. Both singles were also certified Gold by the RIAA.

2014–2016: About to Get Real
Corbin's third studio album, About to Get Real, was released on June 30, 2015. Its first single, "Clockwork", was released to country radio in January 2014. It peaked at number 32 on the Billboard Country Airplay chart. The album's second single, "Baby Be My Love Song", was released on September 8, 2014, and became Corbin's fifth Top 5 country hit. "Yup" and "Are You with Me" were released as the album's third and fourth singles, and peaked at numbers 35 and 41 on the Country Airplay chart, respectively.

2017–2020: Didn't Miss a Beat EP
On January 30, 2017, Corbin released "A Girl Like You" to country radio, the lead single from his upcoming fourth studio album. The song climbed the charts very slowly, and peaked at No. 6 on the Billboard Country Airplay chart after charting in excess of a year. Although the single reached the top 10, Mercury Nashville terminated Corbin from the label in February 2018.

Corbin independently released a new single, "Somebody's Gotta Be Country", in January 2019 and almost made it into the Billboard Country Airplay Chart by peaking at No. 64.

On November 13, 2020, Corbin released his the EP titled "Didn't Miss a Beat". His first release since termination from Mercury. The EP did not include his previous two singles "A Girl Like You" and "Somebody's Gotta Be Country". The release is Corbin's first not to chart on Billboard.

2021–present: Let's Do Country Right 
On January 25, 2022, it was announced that Easton signed a record deal with Stone Country Records. This is Easton's first major deal since Mercury Nashville terminated him from their label in 2018. Easton's brand new promotional single "Marry That Girl" was released on March 3, 2022. Easton came back to country radio on May 9, 2022 with his brand new radio single "I Can't Decide". The single peaked at number 48 on the Country Airplay chart, respectively.

Corbin released his fourth studio album "Let's Do Country Right" on January 20, 2023 his first studio album in eight years since "About To Get Real" in 2015. The albums third single, "Marry That Girl" was released to country radio on February 13, 2023.

Discography

Studio albums

Extended plays

Singles

Notes

Promotional singles

Featured singles

Music videos

Awards and nominations

References

1982 births
Living people
People from Gilchrist County, Florida
American country singer-songwriters
American male singer-songwriters
Mercury Records artists
Country musicians from Florida
Singer-songwriters from Florida
21st-century American singers
21st-century American male singers